I nattens tystnad is a novel by Margit Sandemo.

1998 novels
Novels by Margit Sandemo